Stenopa vulnerata is a species of tephritid or fruit flies in the genus Stenopa of the family Tephritidae.

Distribution
Canada & United States.

References

Tephritinae
Diptera of North America
Insects described in 1873